A substitution of attorney is a legal document that may be created during a lawsuit if a party wishes to replace its attorney with another one. Both attorneys must sign the document (which is otherwise void).

Legal procedure